The Bąk (Horse-Fly) was a single seat motor glider designed and built in Poland from 1936.

Development 
Affiliated to D.W.L., the Warsztaty Szybowcowe – glider workshops produced the Bᾳk, designed by Antoni Kocjan, to compete with the ITS-8 which had been designed to a specification from the I.T.S.M. (Instytut Techniki Szybownictwa i Motoszybownictwa – institute of gliding and motor-gliding techniques), for a cheap ultra-light aircraft suitable for converting trained glider pilots to powered flying. The Bąk I was an immediate success with excellent performance and good handling qualities, passing I.T.L. (Instytut Techniczny Lotnictwa – Technical aviation institute) and airworthiness tests without problems, also proving to have relatively good gliding performance.

The Bąk was built primarily of wood with plywood in a semi-monocoque fuselage and cantilevered single spar wooden wings, with plywood skinned leading edge torsion boxes and wing roots, mid set on the fuselage with marked dihedral. The tail unit comprised a fin, with rudder, integral with the fuselage and a cantilever ply and fabric covered all-flying tailplane, all control surfaces were statically balanced and mounted on ball bearings. Various engines of 16 to 32 hp could be fitted, with the majority of the production Bąk II's was the 32 hp Sarolea Albatros engine driving a twoblade fixed pitch Szomański propeller.

Designer of the Bąk, Antoni Kocjan, became part of the Polish Underground resistance and was killed in the Warsaw Uprising.

Operational history
The Bąk won a FAI world record for duration of flight in a Class D motorglider. It also won a record for altitude, reaching .

Variants 
Bąk IThe prototype and first production machines fitted with an  Kroeber M4 Köller, two- cylinder, horizontally opposed, two-stroke air-cooled engine, (SP-692 and SP-1102 are two known glider registrations).
Bąk IIProduction aircraft fitted with a  Sarolea Albatros two-cylinder horizontally opposed air-cooled engine, 25 built.

Specifications (Bąk II)

See also

References

Notes

Bibliography

 Taylor, J. H. (ed) (1989) Jane's Encyclopedia of Aviation. Studio Editions: London. p. 29

External links
 RWD (aircraft manufacturer)

RWD aircraft
1930s Polish civil trainer aircraft
Single-engined tractor aircraft
Mid-wing aircraft
Motor gliders
1930s Polish sailplanes
Aircraft first flown in 1937